Tom Morven Jeffrey  (born 26 September 1938) is an Australian film and television producer and director. He worked at the ABC and BBC, becoming an ABC drama director in the late 1960s. In 1971 he became head of the Producers and Directors Guild of Australia. He was also a consultant on the Experimental Film Fund and on the Film, Radio and Television Board of the Australian Council for the Arts.

From the early 1980s he stopped directing and concentrated on producing.

Jeffrey was made a Member of the Order of Australia in the 1981 Australia Day Honours.

Select credits
Stormy Petrel (1959) (TV series) – assistant
Crackerjack (1966) (TV series) – director
This Day Tonight (1968) (current affairs TV series) – studio director
Delta (1969) – TV series
Pastures of the Blue Crane (1969) (TV series) – director
The Removalists (1975) – director
Weekend of Shadows (1978) – director
The Odd Angry Shot (1979) – director
The Best of Friends (1982) – producer
Fighting Back (1982) – producer
Going Sane (1985) – producer

References

External links

Australian film directors
Australian film producers
Australian television directors
1938 births
Living people